NA-25 may refer to:

NA-25 (Nowshera-I), a constituency of the National Assembly of Pakistan
NA-25 (Dera Ismail Khan-cum-Tank), a former constituency of the National Assembly of Pakistan
 Sodium-25 (Na-25 or 25Na), an isotope of sodium